Plasmodium dominicana is a extinct parasite of the genus Plasmodium.

The species is only known from a mosquito fossil, dating from the Cenozoic era, that was found embedded in amber. The mosquito vector was identified as Culex malariager. The fossil was found in what is now the Dominican Republic.

The vertebrate host of this species is unknown but it seems likely that it may have been a bird.

Description 

The parasite was first described by Poinar in 2005. It appears that it may have been a relation of Plasmodium juxtanucleare which would place it in the subgenus Bennettinia.

Geographical occurrence 

Fossil found in the Dominican Republic.

Clinical features and host pathology 

The host seems likely to have been a member of the order Galliformes but this cannot be confirmed.

References 

dominicana
Fossil taxa described in 2005